The women's BMX freestyle event at the 2020 Summer Olympics took place on 31 July and 1 August 2021 at the Ariake Urban Sports Park. 9 cyclists from 8 nations competed.

Background

This was the debut appearance of the event, with freestyle BMX added to the programme for the first time (BMX racing was added in 2008).

The reigning (2021) World Champion is teenager Hannah Roberts of the United States, who was also the 2017 and 2019 winner and 2018 bronze medalist.

A preview by Olympics.com noted Roberts as favourite, with Macarena Perez of Chile and Charlotte Worthington of Great Britain (the 2021 World Championships bronze medalist) as other contenders.

Qualification

A National Olympic Committee (NOC) could enter up to 2 qualified cyclists in the BMX freestyle. Quota places are allocated to the NOC, which selects the cyclists. There were 9 quota places available, allocated as follows:

 UCI nation ranking (6 places): Top NOC earns 2 places. NOCs ranked 2nd to 5th each earn 1 place.
 2019 World Championships (2 places): The top 2 NOCs at the 2019 UCI Urban Cycling World Championships, which have not yet earned any quota places, each earn 1 place.
 Host place (1 place): Host nation Japan was guaranteed 1 place.

Competition format

The competition is a two-round tournament, with a seeding round and a final. Each round has the cyclists all do two runs. The runs are 60 seconds long. Five judges give scores between 0.00 and 99.99 based on the difficulty and execution of the rider's run; the scores are averaged for a total run score. In the seeding round, the rider's two run scores are averaged to give a total seeding score. These seeding scores are used to determine the start order of the cyclists in the final, providing a knowledge advantage to the later riders. In the final, only the better score of the two runs counts.

Schedule

The event took place over two consecutive days.

Results

Seeding 
The seeding phase determines the start order for the final. The best ranked rider from the seeding will start last in the final.

Final

See also 
 Cycling at the 2020 Summer Olympics – Men's BMX freestyle
 Cycling at the 2020 Summer Olympics – Women's BMX racing
 Skateboarding at the 2020 Summer Olympics – Women's park
 2021 UCI Urban Cycling World Championships

References

Women's BMX freestyle
BMX at the Summer Olympics
2021 in BMX
Women's events at the 2020 Summer Olympics